The Regio Cantiere di Castellammare di Stabia (Royal Dockyard of Castellammare di Stabia) was founded in 1783 by Sir John Acton, Prime Minister of Ferdinand IV of the Kingdom of Naples. The shipyard was initially unable to build more than one ship of the line and a frigate simultaneously until it was enlarged by order of King Joachim Murat in 1808. It built its first steam-powered ship in the early 1840s.

The shipyard was absorbed by the Naples-based holding company, Navalmeccanica, in 1939. Almost totally destroyed during World War II, the dockyard had to be rebuilt before it could resume operations. Navalmeccanica was incorporated into Italcantieri in 1966, which was in turn taken over by Fincantieri in 1984.

Bibliography

Shipyards of Italy
Castellammare di Stabia
Fincantieri
Shipbuilding companies of Italy